The Big One is an album by Daddy Freddy.

Track listing
"Love Sick" – 5:18
"Keep Talkin'" – 4:39
"Pain Killa" – 5:07
"Rude Boy" – 5:19
"Thru The Dancehall" – 5:01
"The Girl Is Fine" – 5:10
"Spanish Lingua" – 5:07
"Mikey" – 0:10
"Boo Yaka" – 5:50
"How We Do It" – 4:20
"The Big One" – 5:15
"Bye Bye Love" – 5:17
"Keep Talkin (Dub Mix)" – 4:38
"Pain Killa (Full Length Mix)" – 5:08
"Pain Killa (Dubstrumental Mix)" – 5:07

References
http://music.msn.com/album/?album=48926023

Daddy Freddy albums
1994 albums